James Hyde (born 1958 in Philadelphia, Pennsylvania) is an American painter, sculptor and photographer who has worked in New York City since the early 1980s. He has works in the collection of the Museum of Modern Art  and the Guggenheim Museum and has exhibited at the Brooklyn Museum and the Corcoran Gallery of Art in Washington D.C.

Overview
Hyde often employs unconventional materials when painting that range from plaster, nylon, chrome, steel to styrofoam and glass. His practice has been described as an "exploration of physicality" in his experimentations with different textures and planes that often re-evaluate and expand the limits and boundaries of painting.

Hyde describes his work in saying:

In 2003 he started to incorporate photography into his work while maintaining his use of alternative materials acquired from his work as a general contractor in the late 1970s.

Technique

When asked about his technique as an artist, Hyde says:

Hyde's work often involves a number of alternative materials that he has incorporated into his minimalist paintings, sometimes creating three-dimensional pieces that explore new planes and arrangements.

Early career
Hyde arrived as a teenager in New York City in 1977. Although he had already begun his artistic practice he had, for a time early in his career, rejected showing his work within the art world out of a "frustration of what was being shown", instead devoting much of his time to his work as a general contractor. Hyde began to integrate himself more within the art world in the early 1980s.

Awards
Hyde is a recipient of the Guggenheim Foundation Fellowship in 2008, the Pollock-Krasner Grant in 2011, the Joan-Mitchell Foundation Fellowship in 2000 and the New York State CAPS Grant in 1982

Press Mentions

References

External links
 James Hyde Website
 James Hyde Profile at Horton Gallery
 James Hyde by Museo Cantonale d'Arte of Lugano 

Living people
1958 births
American abstract artists
20th-century American painters
American male painters
21st-century American painters
21st-century American male artists
American contemporary painters
Painters from Pennsylvania
Artists from Philadelphia
Artists from Brooklyn
Painters from New York City
Photographers from New York (state)
20th-century American sculptors
20th-century American male artists
American male sculptors
Sculptors from New York (state)
Sculptors from Pennsylvania